The Ministry of Education, Science and Sports of the Republic of Lithuania is a government department of the Republic of Lithuania. Its operations are authorized by the Constitution of the Republic of Lithuania, decrees issued by the President and Prime Minister, and laws passed by the Seimas (Parliament). Its mission is to prosecute state administration functions and realize state policy in education, science, studies branches.

Ministers

References

 
Education and Science
Lithuania
Lithuania